The Minister for State Development, Jobs and Trade is a position in the government of Western Australia, currently held by Roger Cook of the Labor Party. The position was first created in 1910, for the government of Frank Wilson, and has existed in most governments since then, including every government after 1939. The minister is responsible for the state government's Department of State Development.

List of ministers

See also
 Minister for Energy (Western Australia)
 Minister for Mines and Petroleum (Western Australia)
 Minister for Regional Development (Western Australia)

References
 David Black (2014), The Western Australian Parliamentary Handbook (Twenty-Third Edition). Perth [W.A.]: Parliament of Western Australia.

State Development
Minister for State Development